Mount Odin is the most prominent peak, though not the highest, in the Asgard Range, of Victoria Land, Antarctica. It rises over  just south of Lake Vanda. It was named by the Victoria University of Wellington Antarctic Expedition (VUWAE) (1958–59) for the Norse god Odin. Odin Valley is immediately to the east.

References

Odin
McMurdo Dry Valleys